José María Álvarez Mendizábal (August 14, 1891 in Las Pedroñeras – February 21, 1965) was a Spanish politician and lawyer.

He was a bourgeoisie landowner and entered politics with the proclamation of the Second Spanish Republic elected deputy to Congress of Cuenca (province) in the elections of 1931 and the election of 1933 representing the Radical Republican Party, and in the elections of 1936 independently. He served as Minister of Agriculture, Fisheries, and Food between 30 December 1935 and 2 February 1936 in the government. He was presided over by Manuel Portela.

1891 births
1965 deaths
People from the Province of Cuenca
Radical Republican Party politicians
Agriculture ministers of Spain
Members of the Congress of Deputies of the Second Spanish Republic
Politicians from Castilla–La Mancha
Government ministers during the Second Spanish Republic
20th-century  Spanish lawyers